Lieutenant-General Francis Grose (1758 – 8 May 1814) was a British soldier who commanded the New South Wales Corps. As Lieutenant Governor of New South Wales he governed the colony from 1792 until 1794, in which he established military rule, abolished civil courts, and made generous land-grants to his officers. He failed to stamp out the practice of paying wages in alcoholic spirits, with consequent public drunkenness and corruption. Although he helped to improve living conditions to some degree, he was not viewed as a successful administrator.

Early life
Francis Grose was born in 1758 in England. He was the eldest son of Francis Grose (the well-known English antiquary) and Catherine Jordan. Grose received a commission as an ensign in 1775, in the 52nd Foot and was promoted to lieutenant later that year. Grose served during the American Revolutionary War, where he was twice wounded (at the assaults on Fort Montgomery and Monmouth Court House). Returning to England in 1779 as captain of the 85th Regiment of Foot, he acted as recruiting officer. He attained the rank of major in 1783, in the 96th Foot and in November 1789 was placed in command of the New South Wales Corps and appointed Lieutenant-Governor of New South Wales.

New South Wales
Grose did not leave England until late in 1791, arriving in Sydney on 14 February 1792 on board the convict transport Pitt. The voyage was not an easy one as fever killed a large number of people on board, seaman, soldiers, convicts, wives, and children.

Grose became colonial administrator when Governor Arthur Phillip, whose health had been poor for some time (probably due to poor diet), received permission to depart. The European population of New South Wales when Grose took over was 4,221, of whom 3,099 were convicts.

Grose immediately abandoned Phillip's plans for governing the colony. A staunch military man, he established military rule and set out to secure the authority of the Corps. He abolished the civilian courts and transferred the magistrates to the authority of Captain Joseph Foveaux. After the poor crops of 1793 he cut the rations of the convicts but not those of the Corps, overturning Phillip's policy of equal rations for all.

In a connived attempt to improve agricultural production and make the colony more self-sufficient, Grose turned away from collective farming and made generous land grants to officers of the Corps. They were also provided with government-fed and clothed convicts as farm labour, whose products they would sell to the government store at a good profit.

Phillip had realized that unless there was some control over the sale of alcoholic spirits, great evils would follow, but Grose made no efforts in this direction and great abuses such as the payment of wages in spirits became common. The custom of officers trading in spirits was almost universal and in the interregnum before the arrival of Captain Hunter, the colony was rife with drunkenness, gambling, licentiousness and crime.

How far Grose was responsible for this state of affairs it is now impossible to say. There is, however, no reason to doubt the statements of the chaplain, the Rev. Richard Johnson, that he could get no support from the Lieutenant-Governor and no assistance in building a church. On the other hand, the charges against Grose of making indiscriminate grants of land to his friends and fellow officers appear to be without foundation, as the grants made were in accordance with his instructions and to those officers who requested them.

In spite of the low state of morality and the drinking habits of the people, the position of the colony had improved very much when Grose left for England on 17 December 1794. However, most of the credit for this cannot be given to Grose. His substitution of military for civil power was not for the good of the state and he showed no foresight or real strength in his government.

The improvement probably came from better farming methods, for which credit can largely be given to the two chaplains, Johnson and Samuel Marsden. Grose did, however, increase the rations and improve the housing conditions of his troops.

During his tenure, the  Spanish expedition led by Alexando Malaspina visited the colony, 11 March to 11 April 1793.

Return to England
After leaving New South Wales, Grose filled various posts in the army. In 1798, he was on the staff in Ireland. In 1805, he was at Gibraltar where he was promoted to major-general. He was again on the staff in Ireland in 1809. He was promoted to lieutenant-general.

Final years and death

Grose's first wife died 12 January 1813. On 28 March 1814, he married Elizabeth, widow of William Paterson. A month later, on 8 May 1814, he died in Croydon, Surrey, England. His burial record shows that he was 56 years old at time of burial. Elizabeth died in Liverpool, England on 14 May 1839. The Grose Valley, one of the most spectacular regions in the Blue Mountains on the edge of Sydney, is named after Francis Grose.

References

 

1750s births
1814 deaths
British Army lieutenant generals
British Army personnel of the American Revolutionary War
History of New South Wales
52nd Regiment of Foot officers
Lieutenant-Governors of New South Wales